The Household, Income and Labour Dynamics in Australia (HILDA)  survey is an Australian household-based panel study which began in 2001. It has been used for examining issues such as the incidence of persistent poverty; assets and income in the transition to retirement; the correlates and impact of changes in physical and mental health; and an international comparison of wealth and happiness. The survey is widely used by Australian and international researchers in the fields of economics, social science and social policy and by the Australian Government. The HILDA survey is managed by a small team from the Melbourne Institute of Applied Economic and Social Research at the University of Melbourne and the national fieldwork is carried out by ACNielsen and Roy Morgan Research. The survey is funded by the Australian Government through the Department of Social Services.

HILDA has the following key features: 

It collects information about economic and subjective well-being, labour market dynamics and family dynamics. 
Special questionnaire modules are included each wave and have covered topics such as wealth, retirement and fertility intentions. 
The wave 1 panel consisted of 7,682 households and 19,914 individuals. In wave 11 this was topped up with an additional 2,153 households and 5,477 individuals
Interviews are conducted annually with all adult members of each household. Children are interviewed once they turn 15.
The panel members are followed over time. 
Funding has been guaranteed for 18 waves, and the survey is expected to continue beyond wave 18.
Data releases occur at the start of December. The release in December 2019 was for data collected from 2001 (wave 1) to 2018 (wave 18).

HILDA data, when weighted, describe the Australian population (excluding those not living in households). The datasets (PSPP/SPSS, SAS and Stata files) are available for legitimate research purposes and application can be made from the HILDA website. The data are confidentialised by suppression of geographic and other identifying information. A bibliography of published research, the survey methodology, the questionnaires and a user manual are available from the HILDA website.

HILDA data are integrated into the Cross-National Equivalent File (CNEF) which contains population panel data from Australia, Canada, Germany, Great Britain, Korea, Switzerland, Russia and the United States.

See also
Panel Study of Income Dynamics (PSID), USA
Socio-Economic Panel (SOEP), Germany 
Survey on Household Income and Wealth  (SHIW), Italy
UK households: a longitudinal study (UKHLS) / Understanding Society, UK (formerly British Household Panel Survey (BHPS), UK)

External links 
 
Cross National Equivalent File (CNEF) (URL accessed 2016-01-28)

Economy of Australia
Economic data
Panel data
Social research
Household income
Household surveys